Ba Denian (born 27 October 1938) is a Chinese immunologist, physician and educator. He retired from his last position as Dean of Zhejiang University School of Medicine and accepted the position as Honorary Director of Zhejiang University Health Science Center.

Biography
Ba, of Manchu descent, was born in Siping, Jilin Province on 27 October 1938. In 1962, Ba graduated from the Harbin Medical University. In 1967, Ba received his master's degree from the Beijing Medical University (later merged into Peking University and became its medical school). In 1982, Ba obtained PhD from Hokkaido University in Japan.

Ba is a specialist in tumor immunology. He discovered the natural  autoantibody. Ba also proposed a theory to illustrate the relationship between some abnormal immune functions and the hypertension!

Ba was elected to Chinese Academy of Engineering in 1994, and is a foreign member of the National Academy of Medicine, since 1999.

Academic appointments
 Former President, Chinese Academy of Medicine
 Former President, Peking Union Medical College
 Vice-president, Chinese Medical Association
 Honorary President, Chinese Immunological Society
 Honorary Director-general, Chinese Society for Biomedical Engineering
 Dean of Zhejiang University School of Medicine
 Honorary Director, Zhejiang University Health Science Center

References

External links 
 Zhejiang University School of Medicine: Biography of Denian Ba
 PolyU pays tribute to six distinguished Chinese scholars
 Chinese Journal of Cancer Research (Editorial Board)

1938 births
Living people
Members of the Chinese Academy of Engineering
Academic staff of Zhejiang University
People from Siping
Educators from Jilin
Chinese immunologists
Biologists from Jilin
20th-century Chinese physicians
21st-century Chinese physicians
Harbin Medical University alumni
Manchu people
Physicians from Jilin
Members of the National Academy of Medicine